Johnny Jenkins (November 11, 1875 in Cardiff, Wales – November 26, 1945 in Brownsville, Texas) was a Welsh-American racecar driver.

Indy 500 results

References

American racing drivers
Indianapolis 500 drivers
1875 births
1945 deaths
Sportspeople from Cardiff
British emigrants to the United States